Ten ships of the Royal Navy have borne the name HMS Magnet:

  was an 18-gun  launched in 1807 and lost in 1809
  was a 16-gun brig-sloop, previously the French privateer St Joseph. She was captured in 1809 and foundered in 1812.
  was the American ship Magnet that  captured in 1812. Magnet became a prison ship at Halifax, Nova Scotia during the War of 1812.The navy renamed Magnet to Attentive, possibly c. 1814, and as Attentive she served as a store ship until broken up in Britain in 1817.
 HMS Magnet (1814) was an 11-gun brig, formerly the merchant ship Governor Simcoe. She was purchased in 1813 and renamed Sir Sydney Smith. She was renamed HMS Magnet in 1814, and was burnt later that year to avoid capture.
  was a  launched in 1823 that became a Post Office Packet Service packet, sailing out of Falmouth, Cornwall. She was sold in 1847.
  was a gunboat listed between 1830 and 1846
  was a mortar vessel launched in 1855. She was renamed MV 15 later that year, became a dockyard craft in 1857 and was broken up in 1867
  was an  wood screw gunboat launched in 1856 and broken up in 1874.
  was a  launched in 1938.

Royal Navy ship names